Paola Rojas (born Paola Rojas Hinojosa; November 20, 1976) is a Mexican television news anchor. Born in Mexico City, Rojas' education started in the fine arts at a very young age. Her father was Jorge Rojas.

Biography 
Rojas' career started at the radio station Vox FM, where she worked aside the famous Mexican journalist Ricardo Rocha in the Detrás de la Noticia program.

Not long after that, she moved to the Music Network Telehit, where she worked with Horacio Villalobos in Válvula de Escape.

In 2002, she also participated as a judge in the reality show Popstars and then she got her own program called Encuentros Cercanos besides her good friend Poncho Vera.

During that time she hosted another radio show called La Talacha in W Radio, along with Ricardo Zamora, Fernanda Tapia and Mariana del Valle. She also formed part of the team of Planeta 3, with Eduardo Videgaray and José Ramón San Cristóbal.

Then she moved the news program El Cristal con que se mira, and months later she became part of Televisa's news team as the host of A las Tres which she still hosts until today. She also host a weekly radio news program airing on the Radio Formula network.

Currently, Paola received an award for being one of Televisa's most successful women, called Mujer Activa. She was married to Mexican soccer legend, Luís Roberto Alves (Zague).

Notes

External links
 
 
 Biography at Esmas.com 

1976 births
Living people
Mexican television personalities
Mexican women journalists